Anthony Joseph "Tony" Conroy (October 18, 1895 – January 11, 1978) was an American ice hockey player. He played as a forward on the United States hockey teams. The team competed in the 1920 Summer Olympics, winning the silver medal. He moved into the pros with the St. Paul Saints in 1925–26, turning down offers from National Hockey League teams to play out his career in his hometown.

Conroy was born, and died, in Saint Paul, Minnesota.

References

External links

profile

1895 births
1978 deaths
19th-century American people
20th-century American people
American men's ice hockey forwards
Central Hockey League (1925–1926) players
Ice hockey players at the 1920 Summer Olympics
Ice hockey people from Saint Paul, Minnesota
Medalists at the 1920 Summer Olympics
Olympic silver medalists for the United States in ice hockey
St. Paul Athletic Club ice hockey players
United States Hockey Hall of Fame inductees